
Gmina Trojanów is a rural gmina (administrative district) in Garwolin County, Masovian Voivodeship, in east-central Poland. Its seat is the village of Trojanów, which lies approximately 27 kilometres (16 mi) south-east of Garwolin and 81 km (50 mi) south-east of Warsaw.

Villages
Gmina Trojanów contains the villages and settlements of Babice, Budziska, Damianów, Dębówka, Derlatka, Dudki, Elżbietów, Jabłonowiec, Korytnica, Kozice, Kruszyna, Majdan, Mika, Mościska, Mroków, Ochodne, Piotrówek, Podebłocie, Prandocin, Ruda, Skruda, Trojanów, Więcków, Wola Korycka Dolna, Wola Korycka Górna, Wola Życka, Żabianka and Życzyn.

Neighbouring gminas
Gmina Trojanów is bordered by the gminas of Kłoczew, Maciejowice, Ryki, Sobolew, Stężyca and Żelechów.

External links
Polish official population figures 2006

Trojanow
Garwolin County